GEA or Gea may refer to:

 Dzhe, a letter of a Cyrillic Alphabet

Places
 Ge'a, a moshav in southern Israel
 Gea de Albarracín, a town in the province of Teruel, Spain
 German East Africa, a German colony from 1885 to 1919

Companies
 Gustaf Ericssons Automobilfabrik, former automobile manufacturer
 GEA Group, a German engineering firm
 GEA France, the alliance of the French National engineering school (ENAC, ENSMA, ISAE) in aeronautical and space engineering
 Grupo Empresarial Antioqueño, a Colombian conglomerate
 Grupo Empresarial Ángeles, a Mexican conglomerate

Other uses
 Gea (grape), another name for the Italian wine grape Girò
 Gea (spider), a spider genus in the family Araneidae
 Geothermal Energy Association, a US-based geothermal trade organization
 Gaia (mythology), also called Gea or Gæa, a goddess of Greek mythology (Mother Earth)
 Gran Enciclopedia Aragonesa, (Grand Aragonese Encyclopedia)